HMS Ruby was a 50-gun fourth rate ship of the line of the Royal Navy, built at Bursledon in Hampshire to the dimensions specified in the 1741 proposals of the 1719 Establishment, and launched on 3 August 1745.

Ruby was broken up in 1765.

Notes

References

Lavery, Brian (2003) The Ship of the Line - Volume 1: The development of the battlefleet 1650-1850. Conway Maritime Press. .
Michael Phillips. Liste of ships: (R). Michael Phillips' Ships of the Old Navy. Retrieved 10 August 2008.

External links
 

Ships of the line of the Royal Navy
1745 ships
Ships built on the River Hamble